This is a list of notable people who were born or have lived a significant amount of time in Los Feliz, Los Angeles, California.

Arts

Architects
 Michael Rotondi

Artists
 Shepard Fairey
 Joe Matt
 Faris McReynolds

Authors
 Cat Bauer 
 Stefano Bloch 
 Theresa Breslin 
 Raymond Chandler
 Ariel Durant
 Will Durant
 Jenji Kohan
 Andrea Portes
 Buddy Wakefield

Film and television

Actors
 Natalie Portman
 Casey Affleck
 Malin Åkerman
 Kirstie Alley
 James L. Avery, Sr.
 Kristen Bell
 Troian Bellisario
 Valerie Bertinelli 
 Jason Biggs
 Rachel Bilson
 Danny Bonaduce
 Kate Burton
 Adam Campbell
 Vanessa Hudgens 
 Katharine Cornell 
 Tom Cruise 
 Jon Cryer
 Geena Davis
 Leonardo DiCaprio
 Zac Efron
 Shannon Elizabeth
 Colin Farrell
 Sally Field
 Megan Fox 
 Mel Gibson
 Crispin Glover
 Joseph Gordon-Levitt
 Ryan Gosling
 Lauren Graham
 Adrian Grenier
 Tony Hale
 Jon Hamm
 Gale Harold
 Katherine Heigl
 Terrence Howard
 David Hyde Pierce
 Thomas Jane
 January Jones
Steve Kazee
 Val Kilmer
 T.R. Knight
 Ali Landry
 Johnny Lewis
 Bela Lugosi
 Kelly Lynch
 Dave Mallow
 Rooney Mara
 Danny Masterson
 Jayma Mays
 Rose McGowan
 Joel McHale
 Eva Mendes
 Marilyn Monroe (attended kindergarten at Dorris Place Elementary School, near Dodger Stadium)
 Mandy Moore
 Antonio Moreno
 Taylor Negron, comedian and character actor
 Patton Oswalt
 Chris Parnell
 Jim Parsons
 Robert Pattinson
 Bijou Phillips
 Chris Pine
 Brad Pitt
 Parker Posey
 Paula Poundstone
 June Diane Raphael
 Zachary Quinto
 Giovanni Ribisi
 Christina Ricci 
Naya Rivera
 Katey Sagal
 Paul Scheer
 Joshua Seth 
 Michael Sheen
 Alexander Skarsgård  
 Kristen Stewart
 Kiefer Sutherland
 Juno Temple
 Henry Thomas
 Jonathan Taylor Thomas
 Lily Tomlin
 Liv Tyler
 Blair Underwood
 Kate Walsh
 Jennifer Westfeldt 
 Owen Wilson
 Rebel Wilson
 Drake Bell
 Angelina Jolie

Cartoonists
 Walt Disney
Mimi Pond

Directors
 James Cameron
 Livi Zheng
 Steven Soderbergh 
 David Fincher
 Spike Jonze
 Brad Copeland
 Patrick Creadon
 Gus Van Sant
 Frank Darabont
 Cecil B. DeMille
 Ronny Yu
 James Melkonian
 Angela Robinson

Producers 

 Courtney Lilly

Music
 The Airborne Toxic Event

Musicians
 Ryan Adams
 Jesse James Rutherford
 Michael Balzary
 Beck
 Drake Bell
 Vivian Campbell
 Danny Carey
 Glenn Danzig
 Mark Oliver Everett 
 Ernie Halter
 Carly Rae Jepsen
 Al Jolson
 Joe Jonas
 Tony Kanal
 Maynard James Keenan
 Anthony Kiedis
 Joe Lally
 Adam Levine
 Demi Lovato
 Courtney Love
 Madonna (US residence)
 Aimee Mann
 AJ McLean
 Dieter Meier
 Keith Morris
 Karen O
 Michael Penn
 Katy Perry
 Rihanna
 Gavin Rossdale
 Rusko
 Kim Shattuck
 Slash
 Gwen Stefani
 James Valentine
 Eddie Van Halen
 Joey Waronker
 will.i.am
 Alex Turner

Record executives
 Lyor Cohen

Singers

 Mamie Perry Wood, brought opera to Los Angeles

TV and radio
 Jules Asner
Michelle Beadle
 Jo Frost (part-time resident)
 Filip Hammar
 Jim Hill
 Ross King
 Tom Leykis
 Pat O'Brien

Business
 Heidi Fleiss
 Howard Hughes
 Arthur Letts

Crime and punishment
 William J. Bratton
 Johnnie Cochran (where he died in April 2005)
 Lance Ito (lived there as a child)
 Leno and Rosemary LaBianca (killed there in 1969)

Sports
 Steve Berra
 Eric Koston

References

Los Feliz, Los Angeles
Los Feliz
People from Los Feliz
Los Feliz, Los Angeles
Los Feliz